Ivanie Blondin (born April 2, 1990) is a Canadian speed skater. She primarily skates in the long distances of 3000 m and 5000 m and the mass start event. Blondin won a silver medal in the mass start event at the 2015 World Single Distance Speed Skating Championships and a gold medal in the same event at the 2020 World Single Distances Speed Skating Championships. She also won the silver medal at the 2020 World Allround Speed Skating Championships. She won a gold medal at the 2022 Winter Olympics, in Women's team pursuit.

Career
She began her career competing in short track speed skating while a youth in the Gloucester Concordes skating club. She competed there with fellow Olympian Vincent De Haître, to whom she feels like an older sister. After Blondin failed to qualify in short track for the 2010 Winter Olympics in Vancouver she nearly quit sport. Mike Rivet, her coach in Gloucester, convinced her to switch to long track, a decision in which she says, "I was ready to quit skating because I was just so discouraged and disappointed with it. I think (the switch) was the best decision I could have ever made." As a result, Blondin represented Canada in both the long-distance events at the 2014 Winter Olympics in Sochi as well as the team pursuit event.

Blondin won her first major competitive medal when she placed second in the mass start event at the 2015 World Single Distance Championships. After the race, she said, "I would have preferred the gold medal, but finishing first at this stage of my career remains a big accomplishment for me, so I'm super pumped with second place. I'm ecstatic with the result, which follows a fantastic season."

2018 Olympics
After results from the 2017–18 ISU Speed Skating World Cup, Blondin pre-qualified for the 2018 Winter Olympics in Pyeongchang, South Korea. She competed in the 3000 m, 5000 m, mass start, and team relay events.

In 2020, she won the mass start event gold medal at the 2020 World Single Distances Speed Skating Championships at the Utah Olympic Oval in Salt Lake City, United States. This was followed up with the silver medal at the World Allround Speed Skating Championships in March. She was the first Canadian woman to reach the overall podium at that event since 2012 and only the fifth since the event started in 1936.

2022 Winter Olympics
In January 2022, Blondin was named to her first Olympic team. Blondin would go on to win the gold medal as part of the team pursuit event. Blondin next competed in the mass start event at the Olympics, comfortably winning her semifinal to go on to the final. There, with one lap to go, Blondin made her move while following behind Irene Schouten; over the last turn, Blondin led, but Schouten pushed passed her to edge her out for the gold. Blondin happily settled for the silver medal, her second of these games. After the race, she spoke with CBC Sports telling them of her preferred event in the mass start that "These races, the mass start, it fires me up. I'm a little bit of a fighter, and I'm very competitive, so the fact that girls were pushing me and there was a lot of jostling and pushing and shoving around just fires me up and kinda gets me going."

Personal life
Blondin started skating in her backyard at the age of 2. She initially was in figure skating, but seeing herself as a tomboy, she was more inclined to speed skating and took that up at age seven instead. Blondin said she loved the feeling of speed on her skates, which is why she chose the sport over cross-country skiing. Born in Ottawa, Ontario, Blondin attended École secondaire catholique Garneau, a catholic French high school; she completed a Veterinary Assistant program at Robertson College online and has a pet parrot named Gizmo and a St. Bernard-Pyrenees cross named Brooks. Blondin married Hungarian speed skater Konrád Nagy in 2020.

Personal records

She is currently in 6th position in the adelskalender.

References

External links

1990 births
Canadian female speed skaters
Speed skaters at the 2014 Winter Olympics
Speed skaters at the 2018 Winter Olympics
Speed skaters at the 2022 Winter Olympics
Medalists at the 2022 Winter Olympics
Olympic medalists in speed skating
Olympic gold medalists for Canada
Olympic silver medalists for Canada
Olympic speed skaters of Canada
Sportspeople from Ottawa
Living people
World Single Distances Speed Skating Championships medalists
21st-century Canadian women